Carlos Enrique Mendoza (born November 27, 1979) is a Venezuelan professional baseball coach for the New York Yankees of Major League Baseball.

Career
Mendoza played in Minor League Baseball for 13 seasons. He entered the Yankees Minor League system for the 2009 season as a member of the Staten Island Yankees coaching staff before joining the Charleston RiverDogs in 2010. During the 2011 campaign, he served as the manager of the Gulf Coast League Yankees. He then returned to the RiverDogs as their manager before the 2012 season. He became a roving defensive instructor in the Yankees' organization after the 2012 season.

After the 2017 season, Mendoza gained a promotion as an infield coach for the Yankees' major league team.

Mendoza has been credited as a team leader both on and off the field – being hired as an infield coach, despite only playing outfield during his career. He has a number of rituals before, during, and after games that set him apart from other coaches. According to Michael Kay on his radio show, before each game at Yankee Stadium Mendoza ceremoniously tosses exactly 40 sunflower seeds in the grass behind home plate (one for each man on the extended Yankees roster). The prayer he recites after he tosses the seeds is unknown to the public.

On November 11, 2019, Mendoza was named the bench coach of the Yankees, replacing Josh Bard.

On June 6, 2021, Mendoza was ejected for the first time in his MLB career by second base umpire Bill Miller. The game also saw fellow Yankees coach Phil Nevin ejected by home plate umpire Gabe Morales in the previous inning.

References

External links

1979 births
Living people
Sportspeople from Barquisimeto
Venezuelan baseball coaches
Venezuelan baseball players
Baseball infielders
Major League Baseball bench coaches
New York Yankees coaches
Salem-Keizer Volcanoes players
San Jose Giants players
Shreveport Captains players
Arizona League Giants players
Shreveport Swamp Dragons players
Fresno Grizzlies players
Norwich Navigators players
Pensacola Pelicans players
Tampa Yankees players
Tiburones de La Guaira players
Trenton Thunder players
Cardenales de Lara players
Scranton/Wilkes-Barre Yankees players
Minor league baseball managers